Kwalikum Secondary School is a public high school located in Qualicum Beach, British Columbia on Vancouver Island. It is of medium size and is part of School District 69 Qualicum. It was established in 1964.

Qualicum School District facilities review
On October 2, 2010, the school district announced that they are considering closing KSS and requiring that its students attend Ballenas Secondary School in Parksville. Local politicians and citizens have announced that they intend to fight this prospect.

At its meeting in March 2011, the SD 69 Board of Education announced a series of recommendations in support of its commitment that any decisions about school reorganization will be reached only after a comprehensive engagement with the community. This process of engagement will provide School District 69 community members access to multiple opportunities to understand the impact of student enrollment on funding and educational programs and services, and to share their ideas with the Board. To this end, in March 2011, the Board initiated a comprehensive process to create a forum for discussing all the important perspectives related to this issue, and deferred any decision on potential school closures until the spring of 2012.

The school changed from having grades 9–12 and is now a Kwalikum Senior Secondary School with grades 8–12 as of 2015.

References

High schools in British Columbia
Educational institutions in Canada with year of establishment missing